In late January 2019, a severe cold wave caused by a weakened jet stream around the Arctic polar vortex hit the Midwestern United States and Eastern Canada, killing at least 22 people. In early February, a concentration of Arctic air colloquially referred to as the "polar vortex" moved west, and became locked over Western Canada and the Western United States. As a result, February 2019 was among the coldest and snowiest on record in these regions. In early March, the cold once again shifted east, breaking records in many areas. In mid-March, the cold wave finally retreated, but combined with above-average temperatures, precipitation, and a deep snowpack, widespread flooding ensued in the Central US.

Meteorology

Normally, the Northern Hemisphere jet stream travels fast enough to keep the concentration of Arctic air known as the "polar vortex" stationary in the stratosphere over the North Pole. From late December to early January, a sudden stratospheric warming event was observed over the Arctic, which caused the "polar vortex" to weaken and split into three lobes. In late January 2019, one of these lobes traveled southward and stalled over central Canada and north-central United States for about a week before the upper-level flow of the atmosphere directed it over to Western Canada. The influx of frigid air from the North Pole created high winds, and brought extreme sub-zero temperatures, further exacerbated by severe wind chill. Large amounts of snow fell in the affected area. Some have attributed the unusual weather pattern to climate change.

Impact 
At least 22 deaths in North America have been directly attributed to the cold wave, with several of these people frozen to death (hypothermia).

Around 2,700 flights were canceled on January 30, with 2,000 canceled the next day. Amtrak also canceled several trains.

Canada 
The "polar vortex" split into three parts, with the dominant part setting up over the Great Lakes and Nunavut. This gave prairie Canada and northern Ontario a persistent northern flow, leading to record cold temperatures.

Alberta
The coldest was actually  that was located in Red Deer.

British Columbia

Vancouver had its coldest February on record. One benefit from the cold, however, was that it killed many Japanese beetles, an invasive species to the area.

Temperatures reached  in Ashcroft on February 5, the coldest temperature recorded in February since record keeping began in 2010. This record was broken again on the 10th when it reached .

Manitoba

Northwest Territories

Nunavut
Environment Canada issued extreme cold warnings for most of Nunavut. On January 25, Shepherd Bay recorded .

Ontario

Many local schools and universities cancelled classes due to the weather. At Niagara Falls, the falls were left partially frozen by the extreme temperatures.

Warming centres were set up in Windsor and Chatham-Kent libraries for homeless people and anyone else affected by the cold.

Quebec

The cold snap in Montreal began with a blizzard where base temperatures reached . The combination with a single-day  snowfall was the coldest snowiest day in nearly a century. The Fête des neiges winter festival was cancelled due to the extreme cold for the first time in a decade.

Among those killed by the cold was Hélène Rowley Hotte, the 93-year-old mother of Gilles Duceppe, a former federal opposition leader. She was found outside her seniors' residence after being accidentally locked out following a fire alarm.

Saskatchewan

The cold continued throughout the rest of February, resulting in one of the coldest Februaries on record there.

United States

California 
In Humboldt County, snow fell on the beaches for the first time in 16 years.

This year had the most significant snowfall in California since 2011.

In Downtown Los Angeles, the temperature never reached  the entire month of February, the first ever occurrence in 142 years of record-keeping. On February 22, snow was reported in the lower elevations West Hollywood, Eagle Rock and Pasadena within the urban areas of Los Angeles.

Across the state, the persistent cold and heavy rains were beneficial in eliminating drought conditions in California for the first time since 2011.

District of Columbia
In the early morning of January 31, 2019, Washington, D.C., as measured at Ronald Reagan Washington National Airport, reached . The wind chill reached .

Illinois 

Now verified, this is the all-time lowest temperature in the state of Illinois.

Several people died in Chicago due to the cold.

Indiana 

Hundreds of schools and businesses closed and the United States Postal Service suspended delivery service on Wednesday, January 30 and Thursday, January 31.

Other major universities in the state, such as Indiana University, Purdue University and Ball State University, also cancelled all classes.

Iowa 
Most universities closed, including Iowa State University, University of Northern Iowa, and the University of Iowa.
University of Iowa student Gerald Belz died after being found unresponsive near Halsey Hall.

Kentucky 

Two brothers in Boone County, Obie (72) and Roy Fugate (67), died in their driveway outside of their home due to the cold after their truck was stuck in the mud.

Michigan 
On January 28, Michigan Governor Gretchen Whitmer declared a state of emergency due to the record low windchill temperatures. Three people died due to the extremely low temperatures in Michigan: one in Detroit, another in Ecorse, and a third in East Lansing.

The previous day's maximum temperature of  broke the record cold maximum of  set in 1951. The community named Hell in Livingston County was declared to be frozen over on January 31.

Whitmer and Consumers Energy asked residents to turn down their thermostats to  until midnight ET on February 1, after a fire at the compressor station in Macomb County on January 30 due to extra gas usage during the cold wave, to avoid "heat interruptions".

The United States Postal Service suspended mail delivery on January 30 and 31 for most of Michigan.

Hundreds of Michigan schools and businesses were closed for the entire week.

Minnesota 
The coldest wind chill was  recorded at Ponsford.

On January 29, at 10:30 p.m., about 150 homes in the Princeton area, about an hour north of Minneapolis, lost natural gas service.

Montana 
Montana saw some of the worst effects from the cold wave, which lingered into early March. That would be the last high above freezing for Great Falls for 32 days. The state ultimately saw their second coldest February on record.

On March 3, Elk Park Pass hit , setting a statewide low temperature record for March.

New York 
The temperature at noon was still only . The high was only . This tied a record cold high for the day.

In Williamsville (near Buffalo), a locally well-known homeless man, Lawrence "Larry" Bierl, was found frozen to death in a bus shelter on the morning of January 31.

Following a January 27 electrical fire at the federal Metropolitan Detention Center, Brooklyn, over 1,600 inmates were held with little or no heat or electricity until power was restored on February 3. Numerous inmates reported ill health and were seen banging on windows for help. Activists and some New York officials became involved in seeking to improve conditions. Governor Andrew Cuomo announced on February 4 that the United States Department of Justice would be investigating the outage.

North Dakota 
The cold wave made February 2019 the second coldest February in North Dakota.

Washington 
A snowstorm on February 3–4 brought  of snow to parts of Western Washington, including the Puget Sound region, after a winter without measurable snowfall. It was caused by cold air arriving from the north alongside a low-pressure system, dropping temperatures to the 30s and 40s. The snowstorm caused minor disruptions, including school releases and flight cancellations at Seattle–Tacoma International Airport.

A second snowstorm struck the Seattle area and Western Washington on February 8, bringing  of snow that triggered a state of emergency from Governor Jay Inslee. The storm disrupted numerous services and caused shortages of supplies at grocery stores. At least one person died as a result of exposure. The rare intensity of the snowstorm has been described as the strongest that Seattle had seen in over a decade and crippled the city. This was the most snow that the Seattle area had seen over a 4-day period since 1969.

Wisconsin 
On January 28, Wisconsin Governor Tony Evers declared a state of emergency due to the record low windchill temperatures.

A 55-year-old man froze to death in Milwaukee.

See also 

 2017–18 North American cold wave
 2018–19 North American winter
 2019–20 North American winter
 Early 2014 North American cold wave
 February 2021 North American cold wave

References 

2018–19 North American winter
2019 in Illinois
2019 in Manitoba
2019 in Michigan
2019 in Minnesota
2019 in New York (state)
2019 in North Dakota
2019 in Ontario
2019 in Quebec
2019 in Wisconsin
2019 cold waves
Cold waves in Canada
Cold waves in the United States
January 2019 events in North America